In marketing, manufacturing, call centre operations, and management, mass customization makes use of flexible computer-aided systems to produce custom output. Such systems combine the low unit costs of mass production processes with the flexibility of individual customization.Mass customization is the new frontier in business for both manufacturing and service industries. At its core, is a tremendous increase in variety and customization without a corresponding increase in costs. At its limit, it is the mass production of individually customized goods and services. At its best, it provides strategic advantage and economic value. It is one of the product design strategies and is currently used with both techniques (delay differentiation and modular design) together with effective innovative climate to enhance the value delivered to customers.

Mass customization is the method of "effectively postponing the task of differentiating a product for a specific customer until the latest possible point in the supply network". Kamis, Koufaris and Stern (2008) conducted experiments to test the impacts of mass customization when postponed to the stage of retail, online shopping. They found that users perceive greater usefulness and enjoyment with a mass customization interface vs. a more typical shopping interface, particularly in a task of moderate complexity. From collaborative engineering perspective, mass customization can be viewed as collaborative efforts between customers and manufacturers, who have different sets of priorities and need to jointly search for solutions that best match customers' individual specific needs with manufacturers' customization capabilities.

Similarly,  highlights that mass customization involves balancing operational drivers by defining it as "the capability to manufacture a relatively high volume of product options for a relatively large market (or collection of niche markets) that demands customization, without tradeoffs in cost, delivery and quality".

Implementation
Many implementations of mass customization are operational today, such as software-based product configurators that make it possible to add and/or change functionalities of a core product or to build fully custom enclosures from scratch. This degree of mass customization, however, has only seen limited adoption. If an enterprise's marketing department offers individual products (atomic market fragmentation), it doesn't often mean that a product is produced individually, but rather that similar variants of the same mass-produced item are available. Additionally, in a fashion context, existing technologies to predict clothing size from user input data have been shown to be not yet of high enough suitability for mass customisation purposes.

Companies that have succeeded with mass-customization business models tend to supply purely electronic products. However, these are not true "mass customizers" in the original sense, since they do not offer an alternative to mass production of material goods.

Variants
 described four types of mass customization:
 Collaborative customization (also considered co-creation) – Firms talk to individual customers to determine the precise product offering that best serves the customer's needs (see personalized marketing and personal marketing orientation). This information is then used to specify and manufacture a product that suits that specific customer. For example, some clothing companies will manufacture pants or jackets to fit an individual customer. This is also being taken into deeper customization via 3D printing with companies like Shapeways.  Examples: Tailored suits; Converse lets consumers chose the color or pattern of every element of certain types of shoes, either in-store or online.
 Adaptive customization – Firms produce a standardized product, but this product is customizable in the hands of the end-user (the customers alter the product themselves). Example: Lutron lights, which are programmable so that customers can easily customize the aesthetic effect.
 Transparent customization – Firms provide individual customers with unique products, without explicitly telling them that the products are customized. In this case there is a need to accurately assess customer needs. Example: Google AdWords and AdSense
 Cosmetic customization – Firms produce a standardized physical product, but market it to different customers in unique ways. Example: Soft Drink served in: A can, 1.25L bottle, 2L bottle.

He suggested a business model, "the 8.5-figure-path", a process going from invention to mass production to continuous improvement to mass customization and back to invention.

See also
 Configurator
 Dell
 Industry 4.0
 Knowledge-based configuration
 Long tail
 Mail merge
 Manufacturing
 Personalization
 Personalized marketing
 Product differentiation
 Product management
 Prosumer
 Rapid manufacturing
Responsive computer-aided design
 Structure chart
 Variable data printing

Notes

References
 
 
  – detailed look at mass custom manufacturing of ties
 
 
 
 
 

Product management
Production and manufacturing
Marketing strategy
Market segmentation